Buregi is the name of several rural localities in Novgorod Oblast, Russia:
Buregi, Borovichsky District, Novgorod Oblast, a village in Zhelezkovskoye Settlement of Borovichsky District
Buregi, Chudovsky District, Novgorod Oblast, a village in Tregubovskoye Settlement of Chudovsky District
Buregi, Starorussky District, Novgorod Oblast, a village in Nagovskoye Settlement of Starorussky District